Vantage Pointe Condominium is a high-rise 40 Story building in San Diego. Bounded by Ninth and tenth Avenues, and A and B Streets, construction began in 2006 and ended in 2008.  It is one of Downtown San Diego's largest apartment buildings, surpassed only by the Pinnacle West Tower by about 60 feet.  In 2009 the building's owners announced they will refund all the purchase deposits made for its units.

Architect critics have criticized the building's lack of "human-scale relationship at street level," thus earning it the "Grand Onion" award by the San Diego Architectural Foundation.

See also
List of tallest buildings in San Diego

References

External links
 Vantage Pointe Condominium at Emporis.com

Residential buildings completed in 2008
Residential skyscrapers in San Diego
2008 establishments in California